The Sidi Salem Dam is the largest embankment dam in Tunisia located  northwest of Testour on the Medjerda River in Béja Governorate, Tunisia. Constructed between 1977 and 1981, the dams supplies water for irrigation and supports a  power station.

References

Dams completed in 1981
Energy infrastructure completed in 1981
Dams in Tunisia
Hydroelectric power stations in Tunisia
Embankment dams